Monumental United Methodist Church, formerly known as Dinwiddie Street Methodist Church, is a historic Methodist church located in Portsmouth, Virginia. It is a five-bay brick and stucco, Victorian Gothic style church.  It is features a 182 feet tall, two part central tower.  The church was built between 1871 and 1876 on the foundations of an earlier 1831 building that had burned in 1864.

The church was heavily damaged by fire on January 3, 2018.

It was listed on the National Register of Historic Places in 2004. It is located in the Portsmouth Olde Towne Historic District.

References

External links
Monumental Methodist Church website

Churches on the National Register of Historic Places in Virginia
Gothic Revival church buildings in Virginia
Churches completed in 1876
Churches in Portsmouth, Virginia
Methodist churches in Virginia
National Register of Historic Places in Portsmouth, Virginia
Individually listed contributing properties to historic districts on the National Register in Virginia